Bradley Mitchell Silberling (born September 8, 1963) is an American television and film director whose credits include the feature films Casper (1995), City of Angels (1998), Moonlight Mile (2002), Lemony Snicket's A Series of Unfortunate Events (2004) and Land of the Lost (2009).

Early life and education 
Silberling was born in Washington, D.C., the son of Joyce Anne (Tucker), a travel consultant, and Robert Murray Silberling, who was Vice President of CBS Entertainment Productions. His father was born Jewish, whereas his mother converted to Judaism. Silberling attended Williams College in Williamstown, MA and received a BA in English from UC Santa Barbara.  He later studied film directing at the UCLA Film School.

Career 
Silberling began his entertainment industry career before completing his studies. In 1986, he became a Production Assistant for a children's program. He then began to direct television and film. Silberling's 2002 film, Moonlight Mile, is loosely based on his bereavement following the murder of his girlfriend, actress Rebecca Schaeffer, in 1989. In 2006, Silberling's movie 10 Items or Less was the first movie made legally available for download during its theatrical run. This became possible through ClickStar and Silberling's close relationship with its owners Morgan Freeman and Lori McCreary. On March 1, 1999, he started out his own production company Reveal Entertainment, with a first-look development deal at DreamWorks. The first project under Reveal was an attempt to purchase the script The Mystery Dance, for himself to direct in mind, but the idea was later scrapped.

Silberling was approached by Warner Bros. as one of the candidates to direct Harry Potter and the Sorcerer's Stone in 1998. Although he began to enthusiastically plan the film in his mind and was ready to sign on to direct it, Chris Columbus was ultimately chosen as the director. On October 22, 2014, his Reveal Entertainment company signed a deal with CBS Television Studios. He was currently signed with ICM Partners.

Personal life 
Silberling previously dated Rebecca Schaeffer, whom he met at UCLA film school, until she was murdered in 1989.  He is married to the actress Amy Brenneman, whom he met on the set of NYPD Blue and with whom he has two children, Charlotte and Bodhi.  In 2000, the couple purchased a home in Chilmark, Massachusetts prior to moving to West Tisbury, Massachusetts in 2011.

Filmography 
Films

Television

References

External links 
 
 New York Times biography

American television directors
University of California, Santa Barbara alumni
University of California, Los Angeles alumni
UCLA Film School alumni
1963 births
Living people
People from Chilmark, Massachusetts
People from West Tisbury, Massachusetts
Film directors from Massachusetts
Film directors from Washington, D.C.
Fantasy film directors
20th-century American Jews
21st-century American Jews